Lambda Lupi, Latinized from λ Lupi, is a triple star system in the southern constellation of Lupus. It is visible to the naked eye with a combined apparent visual magnitude of 4.04. Based upon an annual parallax shift of just 4.20 mas as seen from Earth, it is located roughly 800 light years from the Sun. The system has a peculiar velocity of  relative to its neighbors, making it a candidate runaway star system. It is a member of the Upper Centaurus–Lupus sub-group in the Scorpius–Centaurus OB association.

The two visible components of this system orbit each other over a period of 70.8 years with a large eccentricity of 0.63. The primary component has a visual magnitude of 4.43, while the secondary is of magnitude 5.23. Both are B-type main sequence stars with a stellar classification of B3 V. One of the pair is itself a double-lined spectroscopic binary, making this a triple star system.

References

External links

B-type main-sequence stars
Runaway stars
Triple star systems

Lupus (constellation)
Lupi, Lambda
Durchmusterung objects
133955
074117
5626
Upper Centaurus Lupus